Ziarat-e Bozorg (also Romanized as Zīārat-e Bozorg; also known as Zeyārat and Zīārat) is a village in Sirik Rural District, Byaban District, Minab County, Hormozgan Province, Iran. At the 2006 census, its population was 532, in 95 families.

References 

Populated places in Minab County